Richard Parton (12 September 1917 – 20 April 2006) was an Australian rules footballer who achieved notable success in his home state of Queensland.

Playing for Windsor in the Queensland Australian National Football League, he was awarded the Grogan Medal in 1949 during the latter stages of his career. He represented his state in his sport numerous times over his career, including a match in 1939 against New South Wales in which he kicked nine goals.

In 2003, he was named at centre half-forward in the Queensland Team of the Century.

References

Zillmere Eagles Australian Football Club players
Australian rules footballers from Queensland
1917 births
2006 deaths